The House of Silence is a lost 1918 American silent drama film directed by Donald Crisp and written by Elwyn Alfred Barron and Margaret Turnbull. The film stars Wallace Reid, Ann Little, Adele Farrington, Winter Hall, Ernest Joy, and Henry A. Barrows. The film was released on April 8, 1918, by Paramount Pictures.

Plot

Cast 
Wallace Reid as Marcel Levington
Ann Little as Toinette Rogers
Adele Farrington as Mrs. Clifton
Winter Hall as Dr. Henry Rogers
Ernest Joy as Leroy
Henry A. Barrows as Carter

Reception
Like many American films of the time, The House of Silence was subject to cuts by city and state film censorship boards. For example, the Chicago Board of Censors issued an Adults Only permit for the film and required cuts, in Reel 1, of the intertitles "You know nothing" etc. and "You've made a mess of it" etc., Reel 3, the intertitle "No, I'm not interested in that sort of thing", entire incident of old woman stumbling on street and young woman assisting her into house, Reel 5, the intertitle "Expect a new one tonight with the usual fee", and the scene of the raid on the house where the women are shown. The Chicago board also directed that the character of the "House of Silence" was to be changed from that of a questionable resort or assignation house to that of a rendezvous for society crooks by inserting a new intertitle, just before the woman leader is shown on the porch, "The House of Silence, a rendezvous for society wolves where criminal activities are cleverly concealed beneath a veneer of respectability" and, after the intertitle "If it is such a notorious place, why is it not raided", insert a new intertitle "Curiously enough the brains of the organization is a woman whose cunning the police have been unable to cope."

See also
Wallace Reid filmography

References

External links
 
 
The AFI Catalog of Feature Films: The House of Silence
lobby poster

1918 films
1920s English-language films
Silent American drama films
1918 drama films
Paramount Pictures films
Lost American films
Films directed by Donald Crisp
American black-and-white films
American silent feature films
1918 lost films
Lost drama films
1910s American films